Sierra de Javalambre is a  long mountain range in the Gúdar-Javalambre comarca of Aragon and the Rincón de Ademuz and Serrans comarcas of the Valencian Community, Spain.

Highway N-234 winds its way between Sierra de Javalambre and Serra d'Espadà reaching the coast at Sagunto and the Autopista AP-7.

Location
This mountain range is located at the eastern end of the Iberian System and the Sierra del Toro its ESE prolongation. Its highest point is Javalambre (2,020 m).

Its summits are usually covered in snow in the winter and the 1,839 m high Cerro Calderón or Alto de las Barracas is the highest peak of the Land of Valencia. Aramón Javalambre is a small ski resort in the range with 12.2 km of ski trails.

See also
List of mountains in Aragon
Mountains of the Valencian Community

References

External links

enciclopedia.cat - Javalambre
 Sierra de Javalambre
 Infoaventura
 Todonieve
 Camarena de la Sierra

Javalambre
Javalambre
Rincón de Ademuz
Javalambre